Wayside is an unincorporated community in Montgomery County, Kansas, United States.  As of the 2020 census, the population of the community and nearby areas was 19.  It is located along U.S. Route 75 northeast of Caney and southwest of Independence.

History
A post office was opened in Wayside in 1887, and remained in operation until it was discontinued in 1984. 

Wayside is west of the original location of the Little House on the Prairie, the Kansas home of Laura Ingalls Wilder; a reconstruction of the house, along with a museum and relocated period buildings, are located at the site.

Geography
It is located at latitude 37.125 and longitude -95.873 at an elevation of 886 feet. Wayside appears on the Tyro U.S. Geological Survey map. Montgomery County is in the Central Time Zone (UTC -6 hours).

Demographics

For statistical purposes, the United States Census Bureau has defined this community as a census-designated place (CDP).

Education
The community is served by Caney Valley USD 436 public school district.

Wayside High School was closed through school unification. The Wayside High School mascot was Panthers.

References

Further reading

External links
 Little House On The Prairie Historical Site - Historical Marker Database
 Montgomery County maps: Current, Historic, KDOT

Unincorporated communities in Montgomery County, Kansas
Unincorporated communities in Kansas